The Butler–Drake football rivalry is an American college football rivalry between the Butler Bulldogs and Drake Bulldogs. The rivalry began in 1932 when both teams were members of the Missouri Valley Conference and re-emerged in 1993 following a 60-year hiatus due to the founding of the Pioneer Football League. The teams have met each year since 1993 and the game has been referred to as the “Battle of the Bulldogs” in reference to each school’s bulldog mascot.

Summary
Drake leads the all-time series 22–8–1. The schools tied a hard fought first meeting 0–0 on November 5, 1932 in Indianapolis. Drake won the next year in Des Moines 26–6. On September 25, 1993 the series was renewed with Butler picking up their first win 28–3 on a dominant rushing performance in Indianapolis. Butler would also win the 1994 game in Des Moines with a near record setting rushing day.

Beginning with the game on September 30, 1995, the rivalry would be defined by winning streaks. Drake won the next two before Butler rallied to score fourteen fourth quarter points in 1997 to secure a 14–13 victory. Drake then won the next four prior to Butler scoring twenty-eight fourth quarter points in a 48–44 win on October 26, 2002. Two notable games occurred within Drake's four game winning streak. In the 2000 match-up Drake prevailed 62–41 on a series high 103 combine points and the next year a 41–39 thriller occurred prior to Butler's 2002 victory. 

Drake won five in a row from 2003 to 2007 including a 29–0 victory on October 14, 2006 which was the rivalries second shutout. Butler won 21–15 in 2008 and again 20–17 on game-winning field goal in 2009. Both wins were in Indianapolis due to a Pioneer Football League scheduling change. Drake won 10–7 in 2010 on a cold day in Des Moines, then 24–14 in Indianapolis,  and 45–20 in Des Moines before Butler snapped the three game streak winning 24–14 in Indianapolis on October 19, 2013. The teams would trade close home victories the next two years with Drake winning in Des Moines 21–19 and Butler coming out victorious in Indianapolis 20–13 on November 14, 2015.  

Drake is currently on a series high six game winning streak. The 2020 match-up postponed from November 14 to April 10, 2021 and moved to Indianapolis due to the Covid-19 pandemic is included in the streak;  along with the 2021 Drake 6–3 victory on a rainy day in Indianapolis providing the lowest combine points scored since the series opening 0–0 tie. No other game within the current six game steak has been decided by less than ten points. The second closest was an eleven point Drake victory in 2017.

Game results

See also
 List of NCAA college football rivalry games

References

College football rivalries in the United States
Butler Bulldogs football
Drake Bulldogs football